Ron Perry (born December 29, 1943) is an American retired basketball player. He played several seasons in the original American Basketball Association (ABA).

Born in Garrisonville, Virginia, Perry went to Stafford High School and Virginia Tech. He was drafted by the Baltimore Bullets of the NBA in the seventh round of the 1967 NBA draft.

References

1943 births
Living people
American men's basketball players
Baltimore Bullets (1963–1973) draft picks
Basketball players from Virginia
Carolina Cougars players
Indiana Pacers players
Miami Floridians players
Minnesota Muskies players
New Orleans Buccaneers players
New York Nets players
People from Stafford County, Virginia
Point guards
Shooting guards
Virginia Tech Hokies men's basketball players